Cynthia Gallagher (born 1951) is an American artist. Her work is included in the collections of the Whitney Museum of American Art and the Metropolitan Museum of Art. She is an Assistant Professor at the Fashion Institute of Technology.

References

External links
Official website

1949 births
Living people
20th-century American artists
20th-century American women artists
21st-century American women